Mar del Plata, Argentina, has a rich history of chess tournaments, including their international chess tournament and open tournament. 
There is also an annual city tournament, which had its first edition in 1946, and reached its 62nd edition in 2007.

The international tournament started off in 1928, but only in the period from 1941 to 1970 was it a truly international tournament with considerable reputation. 
After 1970, only seven international tournaments have been played. The 1951, 1954, 1969 and 2001 editions were zonal tournaments.
There was also a zonal tournament for women in Mar del Plata, in 1969, won by the Brazilian Ruth Cardoso. Silvia Kot from Argentina placed second.

In 1967 the first edition of the open tournament was organized. In 1969 it became an annual event.

The Mar del Plata Variation of the King's Indian Defence (1. d4 Nf6 2. c4 g6 3. Nc3 Bg7 4. e4 d6 5. Nf3 0–0 6. Be2 e5 7. 0–0 Nc6 8. d5 Ne7) is named after a game played in 1953 at the 16th international tournament between Miguel Najdorf
and Svetozar Gligorić.

Mar del Plata International Chess Tournament

{| class="sortable wikitable"
! # !!Year !! Winner
|-
|	1	||	1928	||	
|-
|	2	||	1934	||	
|-
|	3	||	1936	||	
|-
|	4	||	1941	||	
|-
|	5	||	1942	||	
|-
|	6	||	1943	||	
|-
|	7	||	1944	||	  
|-
|	8	||	1945	||	
|-
|	9	||	1946	||	
|-
|	10	||	1947	||	
|-
|	11	||	1948	||	
|-
|	12	||	1949	||	
|-
|	13	||	1950	||	
|-
|	14	||	1951	||	  
|-
|	15	||	1952	||	  
|-
|	16	||	1953	||	
|-
|	17	||	1954	||	
|-
|	18	||	1955	||	
|-
|	19	||	1956	||	  
|-
|	20	||	1957	||	
|-
|	21	||	1958	||	
|-
|	22	||	1959	||	  
|-
|	23	||	1960	||	  
|-
|	24	||	1961	||	
|-
|	25	||	1962	||	
|-
|	26	||	1964	||	
|-
|	27	||	1965	||	
|-
|	28	||	1966	||	
|-
|	29	||	1969	||	  
|-
|	30	||	1971	||	
|-
|	31	||	1976	||	  
|-
|	32	||	1982	||	
|-
|	33	||	1989	||	
|-
|	34	||	1990	||	
|-
|	35	||	1997	||	
|-
|	36	||	2001	||	  
|}

Mar del Plata Open Chess Tournament

{| class="sortable wikitable"
! # !!Year !! Winner
|-
|	1	||	1967	||	
|-
|	2	||	1969	||	
|-
|	3	||	1970	||	
|-
|	4	||	1971	||	
|-
|	5	||	1972	||	
|-
|	6	||	1973	||	
|-
|	7	||	1974	||	
|-
|	8	||	1975	||	
|-
|	9	||	1976	||	
|-
|	10	||	1977	||	
|-
|	11	||	1978	||	
|-
|	12	||	1979	||	
|-
|	13	||	1980	||	
|-
|	14	||	1983	||	
|-
|	15	||	1984	||	
|-
|	16	||	1985	||	
|-
|	17	||	1986	||	
|-
|	18	||	1987	||	
|-
|	19	||	1988	||	
|-
|	20	||	1989	||	
|-
|	21	||	1990	||	
|-
|	22	||	1991	||	
|-
|	23	||	1992	||	
|-
|	24	||	1993	||	  
|-
|	25	||	1994	||	
|-
|	26	||	1995	||	
|-
|	27	||	1996	||	
|-
|	28	||	1997	||	
|-
|	29	||	1998	||	
|-
|	30	||	1999	||	
|-
|	31	||	2000	||	
|-
|	32	||	2001	||	
|-
|	33	||	2002	||	
|-
|	34	||	2003	||	
|-
|	35	||	2004	||	
|-
|	36	||	2005	||	
|-
|	37	||	2006	||	
|-
|	38	||	2007	||	
|}

External links
 Portal page of chess in Mar del Plata: 
 Winners of the international tournament of Mar del Plata: 
 Winners of the open tournament of Mar del Plata: 
 Winners of the city tournament Mar del Plata:

References

 
 

Chess competitions
Chess in Argentina
1928 in chess
1928 establishments in Argentina
Recurring sporting events established in 1928
International chess competitions hosted by Argentina